Hashish (()), also known as hash, "dry herb, hay" is a drug made by compressing and processing parts of the cannabis plant, typically focusing on flowering buds (female flowers) containing the most trichomes. It is consumed by smoking, typically in a pipe, bong, vaporizer or joint, or via oral ingestion. Hash has a long history of usage in countries such as Morocco, Egypt, Afghanistan, Pakistan, India, Nepal, Iran, and Lebanon. Hash consumption is also popular in Europe. In the United States, dried flowers or concentrates are more popular, though hash has seen a rise in popularity following changes in law. Like many recreational drugs, multiple synonyms and alternative names for hash exist, and vary greatly depending on the country and native language.

Hash is a cannabis concentrate product composed of compressed or purified preparations of stalked resin glands, called trichomes, from the plant. It is defined by the 1961 UN Single Convention on Narcotic Drugs (Schedule I and IV) as "the separated resin, whether crude or purified, obtained from the cannabis plant". The resin contains ingredients such as tetrahydrocannabinol (THC) and other cannabinoids—but often in higher concentrations than the unsifted or unprocessed cannabis flower. Purities of confiscated hashish in Europe (2011) range between 3% and 15%. Between 2000 and 2005, the percentage of hashish in cannabis end product seizures was at 18%. With the strength of unprocessed cannabis flowers having increased greatly in recent years—with flowers containing upwards of 25% THC by weight—the strength of hashish produced today and in the future is likely to be far more potent than in these older records.

The consistency and appearance of hash vary depending on the process and amount of leftover plant material (e.g. chlorophyll). It is typically solid, though its consistency ranges from brittle to malleable. It is most commonly light or dark brown in color, though may appear transparent, yellow, black, or red.

History 

Hashish has been consumed for many centuries, though there is no clear evidence as to its first appearance. North India and Nepal have a long social tradition in the production of hashish, known locally as charas.

The first attestation of the term "hashish" is in a pamphlet published in Cairo in 1123 CE, accusing Nizari Muslims of being "hashish-eaters". The cult of Nizari militants which emerged after the fall of the Fatimid Caliphate is commonly called the sect of the Assassins—a corruption of hashishin, Arabic for "hashish-smokers." The 13th-century jurist Ibn Taymiyyah prohibited the use of hashish; he mentioned that it was introduced to Levant with the Mongol invasion (throughout the 13th century). Smoking did not become common in the Old World until after the introduction of tobacco; until the 1500s, hashish was consumed as an edible in the Muslim world.

In 1596, Dutchman Jan Huyghen van Linschoten spent three pages on "Bangue" (bhang) in his historic work documenting his journeys in the East. He particularly mentioned the Egyptian hashish. He said, "Bangue is likewise much used in Turkie and Egypt, and is made in three sorts, having also three names. The first by the Egyptians is called Assis (Hashish (Arab.)), which is the poulder of Hemp, or of Hemp leaves, which is water made in paste or dough, they would eat five pieces, (each) as big as a Chestnut (or larger); This is used by the common people, because it is of a small price, and it is no wonder, that such vertue proceedeth from the Hempe, for that according to Galens opinion, Hempe excessively filleth the head."

Hashish arrived in Europe from the East during the 18th century, and is first mentioned scientifically by Gmelin in 1777. The Napoleonic campaigns introduced French troops to hashish in Egypt and the first description of its useful stems was in 1830 by pharmacist and botanist Theodor Friedrich Ludwig Nees von Esenbeck.

In 1839, O’Shaughnessy wrote a comprehensive study of Himalayan hemp, which was recognised by the European school of medicine and describes hashish as relief for cramps and causing the disappearance of certain symptoms from afflictions such as rabies, cholera, and tetanus. This led to high hopes in the medical community. In 1840, Louis Aubert-Roche reported his successful use of hashish against pestilence. Also psychiatric experiments with hashish were done at the same time with Jacques-Joseph Moreau being convinced that it is the supreme medicament for use in psychiatry.

In the 19th century, hashish was embraced in some European literary circles. Most famously, the Club des Hashischins was a Parisian club dedicated to the consumption of hashish and other drugs; its members included writers Théophile Gautier, Dr. Moreau de Tours, Victor Hugo, Alexandre Dumas, Charles Baudelaire and Honoré de Balzac. Baudelaire later wrote the 1860 book Les paradis artificiels, about the state of being under the influence of opium and hashish. At around the same time, American author Fitz Hugh Ludlow wrote the 1857 book The Hasheesh Eater about his youthful experiences, both positive and negative, with the drug.

Hashish was also mentioned and used as an anaesthetic in Germany in 1869. It was imported in great quantities especially from India where it was called charas. However, there were also people who did not deem cannabis as harmless. Between 1880 and 1900 was the peak of the medicinal use, where hashish compounds were most commonplace in almost all European countries and the USA. Evidence of misuse at that time was practically non-existent (as opposed to widespread reports in Asia and Africa). Hashish played a significant role in the treatment of pain, migraine, dysmenorrhea, pertussis, asthma and insomnia in Europe and USA towards the end of the 19th century. Rare applications included stomach ache, depression, diarrhea, diminished appetite, pruritus, hemorrhage, Basedow syndrome and malaria. The use was later prohibited worldwide as the use as a medicine was made impossible by the 1961 UN Single Convention on Narcotic Drugs.

At the beginning of the 20th century, the majority of hashish in Europe came from Kashmir and other parts of India, Afghanistan, as well as Greece, Syria, Nepal, Lebanon, and Turkey. Larger markets developed in the late 1960s and early 1970s when most of the hashish was imported from Pakistan and Afghanistan. In Greece, Hashish was prevalent in the early decades of the 20th century, and although locally produced for hundreds of years prior, it reached its peak with the coming of two and a half million Greek refugees, expelled from Turkey following the diastrous 1919-21 war. Many of these refugees had habitually smoked hashish in Turkey, using waterpipes, (hookas) called "arghilethes," and due to extreme poverty upon arriving in Greece, and living in overcrowded and poor refugee communities, many hashish dens, called "tekethes" sprung up in Greece's larger cities, the port city of Piraeus, and the northern city of Thessaloniki (where many refugees lived.) This gave rise to a substantial urban underclass and sub culture of hashish smokers called "hasiklithes," and a musical genre "rembetika" (oriental sounding), "urban blues" played on the bouzouki, tzoura, and oriental instruments such as the baglama, outi (oud) and kanonaki (kanun) that spoke of life as a hashish user in the "tekethes", as well as about life as refugees, society's unfairness, lack of financial opportunities, prejudice against the refugees, and the deceit of lovers and others in the community. The "tekethes" were closed down in the 1930s by the Greek police and the "rembetes" were jailed and ostracized. In succeeding decades, there has been a strong 20+ year resurgence in Greece of "rembetika" music with the songs of the rembetes and hasiklithes being contuinually performed publicly by many including the younger generation, as a form of cultural heritage, and have gained respectability and popoularity for their frank expressions of that period, and Greek society in general. Due to disruptive conflicts in the regions, Morocco took over and was the sufficient exporter until lately. It is believed that massive hashish production for international trade originated in Morocco during the 1960s, where the cannabis plant was widely available. Before the coming of the first hippies from the Hippie Trail, only small pieces of Lebanese hashish were found in Morocco.

However, since the 2000s there has been a dramatic shift in the market due to an increase of homegrown cannabis production. While Morocco held a quasi-monopoly on hashish in the 1990s with the 250g so-called "soap bar" blocks, which were of low quality, Afghanistan is now regarded as the biggest producer of higher quality hashish. Since then, hashish quality in Europe has increased while its prices have remained stable, with an exception of the COVID-19 pandemic, where the cannabis street prices surged due to various national lockdowns.

Hashish remains in high demand in most of the world while quality continues to increase, due to many Moroccan and western farmers in Morocco and other hash producing countries using more advanced cultivation methods as well as cultivating further developed cannabis strains which increases yields greatly, as well as improving resin quality with higher ratios of psychoactive ingredients (THC). A tastier, smoother and more aromatic terpenes and flavanoids profile is seen as an indicator of a significant rise in hashish quality in more recent years. Hashish production in Spain has also become more popular and is on the rise, however the demand for relatively cheap and high quality Moroccan hash is still extremely high.

Changes to regulations around the world have contributed greatly to more and more countries becoming legitimate hashish producing regions, with countries like Spain effecting more lenient laws on cannabis products such as hashish. Washington State followed by Colorado started regulating cultivation, manufacturing and distribution of cannabis and cannabis derived products such as hashish in the United States, followed by many other places in the US (such as Humboldt, California), and around the world.

European market
According to the European Monitoring Centre for Drugs and Drug Addiction (EMCDDA), Western Europe is the biggest market for cannabis resin with 70% of global seizures. The European hashish market is changing though: Cannabis cultivation increased throughout the 1990s until 2004, with a noticeable decrease reported in 2005 according to the European Monitoring Centre for Drugs and Drug Addiction. Morocco has been the major source, however lately there has been a shift in the market and Afghanistan has been named the major producer of Hashish. Even though a drop in usage and production has been reported, Morocco produced around 6600 tonnes of resin in 2005.

As 641 tonnes of hashish were consumed in the EU in 2013, the European market is currently the world's largest and most profitable. Therefore, many players are involved in the business, including organised crime groups. The largest cannabis resin seizures in Europe happen in Portugal, due to its proximity to Northern Africa.

The 1990s "soap bars" disappeared and the physical shapes of hashish changed to melon shaped, tablets or olive shaped pellets. Overall the general trend of domestically grown cannabis displacing the imported resin leads to a market reaction of potency changes while the prices remain stable while soap-bar potency increased from 8% to up to 20.7% in 2014.

Generally, more resin than herb is consumed in Europe.

Short-term effects 

The onset of effects is felt within minutes when smoking, and about 30 to 60 minutes when eaten.
 changes in perception; including a feeling of relaxation, pleasure (“high” or euphoria)
 poor short-term memory
 increased appetite
 altered feeling in the senses (the ability to see colors, hear sounds and taste food more clearly), as a result of the drug increasing the activity of the senses
 altered sense of time and space (feeling that time is slow and the distances are longer)
 dry mouth and throat
 impaired motor skills
 cognitive impairment, including poor reactions
 blood-shot eye (hypotony)
 fast heartbeat
 orthostatic hypotension (a drop in pressure when standing)

Side effects with overdose may include anxiety, paranoia and panic.

Substance properties

As hashish is a derivative of cannabis, it possesses identical psychoactive and biological effects. When smoked, THC can be detected in plasma within seconds, with a half-life of two hours. Due to its lipophilic nature, it is widely distributed through the body, and some metabolites can be detected in urine for up to two weeks following consumption.

Hashish is made from cannabinoid-rich glandular hairs known as trichomes, as well as varying amounts of cannabis flower and leaf fragments. The flowers of a mature female plant contain the most trichomes, though trichomes are also found on other parts of the plant. Certain strains of cannabis are cultivated specifically for their ability to produce large amounts of trichomes. The resin reservoirs of the trichomes, sometimes erroneously called pollen (vendors often use the euphemism "pollen catchers" to describe screened kief-grinders in order to skirt paraphernalia-selling laws), are separated from the plant through various methods.

Hashish samples from India, Lebanon and Morocco confiscated in Europe and Israel in 2005 contained all appreciable amounts of cannabidiol (CBD), and cannabinol (CBN), in addition to tetrahydrocannabinol (THC). In some samples the CBD-content was significantly higher than the THC-content. The simultaneous occurrence of these three cannabinoids constitute the typical, chemical profile of hashish consumed in Europe and Northern Africa. In comparison, most high-potency marijuana products contain only THC. It is believed that the psychotropic effects of hashish are therefore more subtle, and sedative.

Use

Hashish can be consumed by oral ingestion or smoking. When smoked, it may be smoked in a pipe, bong, vaporizer or joints, where it is often mixed with tobacco, as pure hashish will burn poorly if burned alone. THC has a low water solubility therefore ingestion should be done alongside a fatty meal or snack. Not all hashish can be consumed orally as some is not decarboxylated during manufacture. Generally the methods are similar to overall cannabis consumption.

Manufacturing processes 

The sticky resins of the fresh flowering female cannabis plant are collected. Traditionally this was, and still is, done in remote locations by pressing or rubbing the flowering plant between two hands and then forming the sticky resins into a small ball of hashish called charas. This method produces the highest amount of cannabinoids (THC content up to 60%) without chemical solvents or distillation. The best quality charas is produced in Central Asia, and sold in sausage-like shapes.

Mechanical separation methods use physical action to remove the trichomes from the dried plant material, such as sieving through a screen by hand or in motorized tumblers. This technique is known as "drysifting". The resulting powder, referred to as "kief" or "drysift", is compressed with the aid of heat into blocks of hashish; if pure, the kief will become gooey and pliable. When a high level of pure THC is present, the end product will be almost transparent and will start to melt at the point of human contact.

Ice-water separation is another mechanical method of isolating trichomes. Newer techniques have been developed such as heat and pressure separations, static-electricity sieving or acoustical dry sieving.

Trichomes may break away from supporting stalks and leaves when plant material becomes brittle at low temperatures. After plant material has been agitated in an icy slush, separated trichomes are often dense enough to sink to the bottom of the ice-water mixture following agitation, while lighter pieces of leaves and stems tend to float.

The ice-water method requires ice, water, agitation, filtration bags with various-sized screens and plant material. With the ice-water extraction method the resin becomes hard and brittle and can easily be separated. This allows large quantities of pure resins to be extracted in a very clean process without the use of solvents, making for a more purified hashish.

Chemical separation methods generally use a solvent such as ethanol, butane or hexane to dissolve the lipophilic desirable resin. Remaining plant materials are filtered out of the solution and sent to the compost. The solvent is then evaporated, or boiled off (purged) leaving behind the desirable resins, called honey oil, "hash oil", or just "oil". Honey oil still contains waxes and essential oils and can be further purified by vacuum distillation to yield "red oil". The product of chemical separations is more commonly referred to as "honey oil." This oil is not really hashish, as the latter name covers trichomes that are extracted by sieving. This leaves most of the glands intact.

In a study conducted in 2014 by Jean-Jaques Filippi, Marie Marchini, Céline Charvoz, Laurence Dujourdy and Nicolas Baldovini (Multidimensional analysis of cannabis volatile constituents: Identification of 5,5-dimethyl-1-vinylbicyclo[2.1.1]hexane as a volatile marker of hashish, the resin of Cannabis sativa L.) the researchers linked the characteristic flavour of hashish with a rearrangement of myrcene caused during the process of manufacture.

Depending on the production process, the product can be contaminated with different amounts of dirt and plant fragments, varying greatly in terms of appearance, texture, odour and potency. Also, adulterants may be added in order to increase weight or modify appearance.

Morocco has been the major hashish producer globally with €10.8 billion earned from Moroccan resin in 2004, but some so-called "Moroccan" may actually be European-made. The income for the farmers was around €325 million in 2005. While the overall number of plants and areas shrank in size, the introduction of more potent hybrid plants produced a high resin rate. The range of resin produced is estimated between 3800 and 9500 tonnes in 2005.

The largest producer today is Afghanistan, however studies suggest there is a "hashish revival" in Morocco.

Quality 
Tiny pieces of leaf matter may be accidentally or even purposely added; adulterants introduced when the hashish is being produced will reduce the purity of the material and often resulting in green finished product. If hash is really sticky, this can mean that additional oils have been added to increase the overall weight of the product. The most common quality indicator is the smell. High-quality hash will smell fragrant and aromatic, whereas hash of low quality may have a distinct mouldy or musty aroma. The tetrahydrocannabinol (THC) content of hashish comes in wide ranges from almost none to 65% and that of hash oil from 30% to 90%. Hashish can also contain appreciable amounts of CBD, CBN and also contain trace amounts of other cannabinoids

As mentioned above, there has been a general increase in potency as the competition has grown bigger and new hybrid plants have been developed.

See also 

 Cannabis concentrate
 Cannabis culture
 Cannabis (drug)
 Charas
 Club des Hashischins
 Hash oil
 Hemp oil

References

Further reading 
 Hashish! by Robert Connell Clarke, 
 The Hasheesh Eater by Fitz Hugh Ludlow; first edition 1857
 Marihuana The first twelve thousand years by Ernest L. Abel, 1980, 
 Starks, Michael. Marijuana Potency. Berkeley, California: And/Or Press, 1977. Chapter 6 "Extraction of THC and Preparation of Hash Oil" pp. 111–122. .

External links 

 Bibliography of scholarly histories on cannabis and hashish
 Altered States Database

Articles containing video clips
Cannabis culture
Cannabis smoking
Entheogens
Preparations of cannabis